The 1992 Nebraska Cornhuskers football team represented the University of Nebraska–Lincoln in the 1992 NCAA Division I-A football season. The team was coached by Tom Osborne and played their home games in Memorial Stadium in Lincoln, Nebraska.

Schedule

Roster and coaching staff

Depth chart

Game summaries

Utah

Middle Tennessee State

Washington

Arizona State

Oklahoma State

Missouri

Colorado

Kansas

at Iowa State

Oklahoma

Kansas State

Florida State

Rankings

Awards

NFL and pro players
The following Nebraska players who participated in the 1992 season later moved on to the next level and joined a professional or semi-pro team as draftees or free agents.

References

Nebraska
Nebraska Cornhuskers football seasons
Big Eight Conference football champion seasons
Nebraska Cornhuskers football